Travis Way (born April 30, 1975) is an American curler and curling coach.

At the national level, he is a 2001 United States men's champion curler.

Awards
USA Curling Male Athlete of the Year: 1996.

Teams

Record as a coach of national teams

References

External links

Living people
1975 births
American male curlers
American curling champions
American curling coaches
Sportspeople from the Seattle metropolitan area